The Ampeg SVT is a bass guitar amplifier designed by Bill Hughes and Roger Cox for Ampeg and introduced in 1969. The SVT is a stand-alone amplifier or "head" as opposed to a "combo" unit comprising amp and speaker(s) in one cabinet, and was capable of 300 watts output at a time when most amplifiers could not exceed 100 watts output, making the SVT an important amp for bands playing music festivals and other large venues.

The SVT has been through many design changes over the years but is still in production today. While the SVT could be used with any 300 watt, 2- or 4-ohm cabinet combination, Ampeg recommended that it be used with a pair of sealed 8x10" speaker enclosures because one cabinet could not handle the power of the SVT. It wasn't until 1980 that the speakers in the enclosures were updated to a power handling rating of 350 watts, allowing a player to use an SVT head with only one cabinet.

SVT originally stood for Super Vacuum Tube, but Ampeg has since revised the meaning of the acronym to Super Valve Technology, with the word "valve" referring to the vacuum tubes (called "valves" in Britain and some other regions) used in the amp.

History
Following Unimusic's acquisition of Ampeg in 1967, the new company management was actively pursuing the rock market, opening offices in Chicago, Nashville, and Hollywood, and developing products designed to address the needs of rock musicians. When The Rolling Stones began rehearsing for their 1969 U.S. Tour in Hollywood, a power conversion failure blew up all of their UK Fender amplifiers. Their road manager, Ian Stewart contacted Rich Mandella at the Ampeg office in Hollywood, and Rich arranged for the band to use five prototype high-output amplifier heads of a new model being developed by Bill Hughes and Roger Cox. These new amps employed a 14-tube design to generate 300 watts of power in an era when most tube amps generated less than 100. The Rolling Stones took these prototype Ampeg amps on tour along with Rich Mandella, playing all guitars and basses through them for the entire tour. After the tour, Ampeg put the SVT into production, introducing it at the NAMM Show in 1969.

Types
There are three types of original SVT amps. The first are the "blue line" SVTs, so named after the blue screen printing that surrounds the tone controls. Early 1969-70 "blue lines" used 6146B beam power vacuum tubes in the output stage, which proved unstable and was switched to the more robust, reliable and commonly-used 6550 tube around mid-1970.

The second version of a vintage SVT is what is called the "black line" SVT, earning its name from the black (rather than blue) faceplate screen printing. Like the later-revision "blue lines" models, the "black line" SVTs utilize 6550 power vacuum tubes instead of 6146Bs. Later 1970s models have the same features as the "black line" SVTs, except the lines around the tone controls have rounded corners and curve into the tone controls. Additionally, these models included 3-prong power cables, and did not include a polarity switch.

In the early 1980s, Ampeg was bought by Music Technologies, Inc. (MTI), which contracted to have SVTs manufactured in Japan. While MTI-era SVTs are mostly identical to the previous versions, they did have differences. Cosmetically, MTI SVTs have black faceplates with white lettering, black grill cloth, "elephant hide" or rougher textured tolex, and rack case-style spring-loaded handles, updated from the previous (and painful) rubber-covered metal strap handles. These SVTs also include a back panel selector toggle for 2 or 4 ohm speaker impedance loads and a longer and thicker gauge 3-prong power cable. Additionally, some components, such as the transformers, on MTI-era SVTs are of Japanese origin as opposed to the original SVT transformers made by Chicago-based ETC.

In 1986, St. Louis Music acquired the rights to the Ampeg name and took possession of all remaining MTI inventory, which contained enough original components to build 500 amps. These 1987 Limited Edition SVTs were built in the U.S. by SLM's own Skunk Works crew, and each included an engraved panel indicating the unit's number within the production of 500 total units. In 1990, Ampeg introduced the SVT-II and SVT-II Pro, and in 1994, introduced the SVT-CL (Classic).

In 2005, LOUD Technologies (now LOUD Audio, LLC) acquired St. Louis Music, including Ampeg. Under LOUD's management, production of Ampeg and versions of SVTs and cabinets was moved to Asia. In 2010, Ampeg introduced the Heritage Series line, manufactured in LOUD Technologies' facility in Woodinville, Washington, including the Heritage SVT-CL head and SVT-810E and SVT-410HLF cabinets. The updated head featured JJ-branded preamp and driver tubes and "Winged C" 6550 power amp tubes, all tested and matched by Ruby Tubes in California, along with a thicker 1.6mm two-layer printed circuit board with through-hole plating and increased copper weight.

In May, 2018, Yamaha Guitar Group acquired Ampeg from LOUD Audio. Ampeg continues to manufacture and sell Heritage Series and SVT Pro Series models of SVT.

Tubes and modifications
The SVT amps with 6146B tubes tend to put out a bit more power as well as have a more pronounced grind in low mids, as opposed to the more round, deeper bass sound provided by SVTs with 6550A tubes. This sound characteristic is mostly due to 6146 being much lower in transconductance and less sensitive to drive signal, requiring a higher level from the Pre-amp, which can create more "harmonic growl."

The issues with the earliest version of the SVT were in the early design of the driver circuit, not the 6146B tube which is a stable and reliable tube. The earliest SVT driver circuit's design would on occasion result in blown 6146B tubes. Because the front end 12BH7 voltage amplifier is fed from the 430 V node, during loud transients and overloads this will produce an AC signal that far exceeds the 12BH7 follower that has 220 V on the plates. So when the follower grid is driven well over its own plate voltage, it saturates on the positive half of the signal and thus takes over the BIAS voltage, forcing it very positive. The time for this voltage to come back to normal is based on the time constant of the 150 kΩ mixer resistors and the coupling cap - but by this time it is too late, the bias is pushed too far into the positive and the current gets pushed through the 6146, resulting in blown tubes.

Some users have an electronics technician re-wire the 12BH7 feed the same as on the later 6550 heads. By adding a 1K and filter cap feeding from the 220 V screen supply to the front voltage amp of the 12BH7, a 6146B tube runs reliably with far fewer issues. However, conversion of 6146B to 6550 tubes also has a dramatic impact on the output power. The amp will produce roughly 225 watts, due to the screen voltage being too low. As such, the power transformer of a 6146B SVT will be about 220 V DC on the screen supply at idle instead of the typical 350 V idle screen voltage normally seen on 6550 amps. One solution is wire the screens in a voltage double arrangement, which will end up at roughly 400 V screen voltage at idle. This will make for a very powerful 400 W SVT. Conversion from a 6550 tube to 6146B tube is a bit trickier, as the 6146B will not tolerate anything over 250 V on the screens or else it will arc over. Some amp technicians prefer to disassemble the PT and tap the windings from the side of the bobbin to create a lower voltage taps. Other methods are to use voltage regulation.

The SVT's pre-amp is notorious for ground loop hum. Re-wiring and separating the audio ground shield from the power return ground lead in the MOLEX connector is one solution. 

Diodes were later used to by-pass the 22ohm screen resistors. In the event of a tube short failure or simply a transient overload condition the diode will conduct once the current in the 22ohm screen resistor reaches 30mA and beyond, preventing further burning of the PCBA. The diode will clamp the current in the 22ohm screen resistor to 30mA, so preferably the plate resistor will blow, since the plate resistor is acting as a "fuse".

Plate resistors should be kept off the circuit board by approx 1/2" min to prevent PCBA burning. The diode is taking on the current surge to protect the 22 Ω resistor, however the peak over-current in the diode can only sustain for a short duration. The 6550A version usually idles with roughly 700 V DC on the plate and 350 V DC on the Screens (though during full clean sine wave 300 W power output, operating voltages will dip to roughly 650 V DC on the Plate and 325 V on the Screens). The output transformer plate load is 1.6 K at 4 Ω tap and 1.75 K at the 2 Ω tap.

References

Instrument amplifiers